Stenopsocus stigmaticus is a species of Psocoptera from the family Stenopsocidae that can be found in England, Ireland, and Wales. It can also be found in Austria, Belgium, Croatia, Finland, France, Germany, Hungary, Italy, Luxembourg, Poland, Romania, Spain, Switzerland, and the Netherlands. The species are yellowish-black coloured.

Habitat
The species feed on alder, ash, blackthorn, elder, hawthorn, pine, sallow, and willow. They also feed on fruits such as apple, horse chestnut, and plum.

References

Stenopsocidae
Insects described in 1842
Psocoptera of Europe